Mijo Tunjić (born 24 February 1988) is a Dutch professional footballer who plays for German club 1. Göppinger SV as a striker.

Personal life
He is of Bosnian Croat descent.

References

External links
 

1988 births
People from Gradačac
Dutch people of Croatian descent
Living people
Association football forwards
Dutch footballers
SpVgg Unterhaching players
Stuttgarter Kickers players
FC Rot-Weiß Erfurt players
SV Elversberg players
3. Liga players
Regionalliga players
Oberliga (football) players
Dutch expatriate footballers
Expatriate footballers in Germany
Dutch expatriate sportspeople in Germany